The New York City Police Department's Medal for Valor is the department's third highest medal. It is conferred upon police officers for acts of outstanding personal bravery intelligently performed in the line of duty at imminent personal hazard to life under circumstances evincing a disregard of personal consequences.

Description 
The image of the Police Memorial Statue, representing the years of selfless service that New York City police officers have given to its citizens, is cast in the center of the medal. Mediterranean evergreen laurel leaves, representing honor and glory dating back to ancient Rome, surround the center of the medal. The outer background and ribbon are police blue. The words "For Valor, Police Department City of New York" are written on the face of the medal in gold lettering. The two gold stars signify the level of importance associated with this recognition. The recipient's name is engraved on the reverse side of the medal.

The respective breast bar is a solid blue bar.

Awards

2006 
At the 2006 Medal Day Ceremony in New York, Mayor Michael Bloomberg and NYPD Police Commissioner Raymond Kelly awarded 13 Medals for Valor:

 Detective James Monaco, Queens Special Victims Squad Detective Bureau
 Police Officer Ernest Kenner, 73rd Precinct
 Sergeant Anthony J. Sestito, 122nd Precinct
 Detective Hector Natal, 33rd Detective Squad
 Police Officer Branden Pedrosa, 33rd Precinct
 Sergeant Gilbert Noa, Transit District 12
 Detective Josue Barreto, Bronx Robbery Squad
 Police Officer Mehmet Buyukdag, 48th Precinct
 Police Officer James Jacoberger, 43rd Precinct
 Police Officer Gregory Jeung, 48th Precinct
 Detective Michael Callan, Manhattan North Homicide Task Force Detective Bureau
 Detective Thomas Clarke, Manhattan North Homicide Task Force Detective Bureau
 Captain Daniel Carione, Internal Affairs Bureau

2007 
At the 2007 Medal Day Ceremony in New York, Mayor Michael Bloomberg and NYPD Police Commissioner Raymond Kelly awarded 14 Medals for Valor:
 Detective Arturo Willis – Counter Terrorism Division
 Police Officer Carlos Arroyo – Brooklyn South Gang Squad
 Retired Police Officer Kai Wong – 47th Precinct
 Sergeant William Danchak –  Employee Management Division
 Sergeant Edward Deighan – 70th Precinct
 Sergeant Richard Pignateli – 67th Precinct
 Detective James Halleran – Emergency Service Squad 8
 Police Officer Margaret Zaffarese – Police Academy
 Lieutenant Brian Connolly – 9th Precinct
 Police Officer Robert Burns – 113th Precinct
 Police Officer Shannon Pearl – 113th Precinct
 Sergeant Michael Ruzzi – Police Service Area 7
 Police Officer Joseph Foreman, III – School Safety Division
 Police Officer Brian Sheehy – 120th Precinct

2008 
Twelve Medals of Valor were awarded at the 2008 Medal Day ceremony by Mayor Michael R. Bloomberg and Police Commissioner Raymond W. Kelly:
 Sergeant Robert Henderson – Intel Operations and Analysis Section
 Detective Herbert Martin – 81st Detective Squad
 Police Officer Brendan Owens – Manhattan North Robbery Squad
 Lieutenant Timothy Farrell –  101st Precinct
 Sergeant Patrick O’Neill – Counter Terrorism
 Police Officer Joseph Cruzado – Gang Squad Queens
 Sergeant Brian O’Toole – Internal Affairs Bureau
 Police Officer Ronald Martiny – 103rd Precinct
 Detective George Sichler – Harbor Unit
 Detective Thomas Stevens – Harbor Unit
 Detective Francis Vitale – Harbor Unit
 Police Officer John Purcell – Harbor Unit

2009
Thirteen Medals of Valor were awarded at the 2009 Medal Day ceremony by Mayor Michael R. Bloomberg and Police Commissioner Raymond W. Kelly:
 Detective Richard Burt – Intelligence Division
 Sergeant Pedro Candia – PBBX Task Force
 Police Officer Edward Cantaloupe – 44th Precinct
 Police Officer Gregory Chin – Transit District #4
 Sergeant Louis DeCeglie – Narcotics Borough Manhattan South
 Police Officer Maribeth Diaz – MTS Precinct
 Former Police Officer Stephen Donohue – 47th Precinct
 Lieutenant Kevin Gallagher – Narcotics Borough Brooklyn South
 Sergeant Michael Gaudio – 44th Precinct
 Sergeant Michael Raso – PSA #5
 Detective Alfred Robinson – Detective Borough Brooklyn North Operations
 Retired Detective Dominick Romano – PBQS
 Detective James Schweiker – 17th Precinct

2010
There were fifteen Medals of Valor awarded by Mayor Michael R. Bloomberg and Police Commissioner Raymond W. Kelly at the 2010 Medal Day ceremony.
 Sergeant Felipe Gomez
 Sergeant Kenneth Russo
 Retired Sergeant John Boesch
 Detective Michael Corvi
 Detective John Lunt
 Detective Timothy Murphy
 Detective Michael O’Brien
 Detective Frank Pinto
 Detective Frank Sarrica
 Detective Anthony Schaffer
 Police Officer Rory Mangra
 Police Officer Brian McIvor
 Police Officer Erik Merizalde
 Police Officer Charles Steiger
 Police Officer Michael Tavolario

2011
Mayor Michael R. Bloomberg and Police Commissioner Raymond W. Kelly awarded six Medals of Valor at the 2011 Medal Day ceremony.
 Police Officer Danny Acosta
 Detective Raymond Clair
 Police Officer Tara Hayes
 Detective Patrick LaScala
 Police Officer Richard Lopez
 Police Officer Brian McIvor

2012
Mayor Michael R. Bloomberg and Police Commissioner Raymond W. Kelly awarded fifteen Medals of Valor at the 2012 Medal Day ceremony.
 Lieutenant Lawrence Serras – Emergency Services Unit
 Sergeant Robert Abramson – Patrol Borough Manhattan North Anti-Crime Unit
 Sergeant William Coyle – 28th Precinct
 Detective Steven Browning – Aviation Unit
 Detective Christopher Condon – Emergency Service Unit
 Detective Keith Connelly – Emergency Services Unit
 Detective Glenn Estrada – 75th Precinct
 Detective Peter Quinn – Emergency Services Unit
 Detective Nicholas Romano – Queens Gang Squad
 Detective Michael Sileo – Aviation Unit
 Police Officer Zachary Bonner −32nd Precinct
 Police Officer Nicholas Douglas (retired) – 32nd Precinct
 Police Officer Derrick Edouard – 41st Precinct
 Police Officer Daniel Ehrenreich – 32nd Precinct
 Police Officer Ryan Norman – Emergency Services Unit

2013
Mayor Michael R. Bloomberg and Police Commissioner Raymond W. Kelly awarded thirteen Medals of Valor at the 2013 Medal Day ceremony.
 Lieutenant Patrick Brown – 23 Precinct Detective Squad
 Sergeant Anthony Gulotta – Patrol Borough Brooklyn North (75 Precinct Impact)
 Sergeant Javier Rodriguez – 113 Precinct
 Detective Fredric Daughtry – 63 Precinct Detective Squad
 Detective Alexander Grandstaff – 81 Precinct Detective Squad
 Detective Vito Nicoletta – 75 Precinct Detective Squad
 Police Officer Arvid Flores – 43 Precinct
 Police Officer Jason Jackson – 75 Precinct
 Police Officer Zahid Mehmood – 78 Precinct Detective Squad
 Police Officer Paul Mertens – Detective Borough Bronx
 Police Officer Peter Naughton – Patrol Borough Queens North Specialized Units
 Police Officer Richard Pengel – 25 Precinct Detective Squad
 Police Officer Daniel Trione – 75 Precinct

See also 

 Medals of the New York City Police Department
 New York City Police Department Medal of Honor
 New York City Police Department Combat Cross

References 

MAYOR BLOOMBERG AND POLICE COMMISSIONER KELLY HONOR 24 MEMBERS OF POLICE DEPARTMENT AT 2007 MEDAL DAY CEREMONY June 12, 2007

Medal for Valor